Jim Bywater is a British actor who has appeared both in film and television roles. Probably one of his most notable roles was as Wilf Starkey in Coronation Street in 1985. Other television appearances include Bodger and Badger, The Bill, Dalziel and Pascoe and Bulman. His film appearances include the 2009 adaptation of Colette's Chéri.

Bywater is married to the actor, journalist and broadcaster Jeni Barnett.

External links

Year of birth missing (living people)
Living people
British male film actors
British male television actors
20th-century British male actors
21st-century British male actors